The  is a full-size luxury car originally manufactured by Mitsubishi Motors from late 1999 to 2001 as the flagship of the company's domestic range, alongside the shorter Proudia, and was reintroduced 2012 to Japanese buyers as a rebadged fifth-generation Nissan Cima. The Dignity was discontinued for the second time in 2016. In Japan, it was sold at a specific retail chain called Galant Shop.

The name "Dignity" was used to describe the "peerless grandeur and majestic stateliness" of the model.



First generation (S43A; 1999) 

The Dignity/Proudia range was designed by Mitsubishi Motors and co-manufactured with Hyundai of South Korea, who marketed their own version as the Hyundai Equus (from 1999 to 2009). The Dignity was introduced as a competitor to the Nissan President, the Toyota Celsior, and the Toyota Century as the top level flagship, however Mitsubishi chose to use a transversely installed engine with front-wheel drive. A Dignity is used by Fumihito, Prince Akishino, the second son of Emperor Emeritus Akihito.

It used MacPherson struts for the front suspension and a multi-link suspension for the rear wheels. The car was equipped with several features like Driver Support System (CCD cameras to monitor adjacent lanes and behind the car for lane departure warning system and blind spot monitor, and a lidar activated adaptive cruise control), self-levelling multi-link air suspension with electronic damping control.

The Dignity and Proudia's combined volumes fell far shy of Mitsubishi's forecasted 300 sales per month, and they were available for only fifteen months from their introduction on February 20, 2000, before Mitsubishi's financial difficulties forced the company to discontinue both models in an effort to streamline its range and reduce costs. However, the Equus proved more commercially successful and would remain in production until replaced in 2008.

Production and sales

Second generation (BHGY51; 2012) 

The Dignity nameplate was revived as a rebadged rear-wheel drive, fifth-generation Nissan Cima to Japanese customers only starting April 26, 2012. As with the preceding generation, the Dignitys were used as official cars by the Akishino branch of Japan's Imperial family.

It was the first hybrid electric Mitsubishi Motors model to be sold in Japan, and it complied with the 2005 emission standards, achieving a 75% reduction level over the previous model, and achieving the 2003 Japanese government fuel economy standards. While the Dignity was only offered with one engine option, which is the Nissan's 3,498 cc VQ35HR V6 engine, the "Pure Drive/Hybrid" badge is not installed, and it was differed cosmetically from the Cima on which it is based. Many items offered on the Dignity were carried over from the Cima, including the lattice rear retractable window screen. The Dignity was offered in only one trim package, called the "VIP", which is equivalent to the Cima's VIP G trim. However, the Dignity was not available with all-wheel drive system, unlike the Cima. Nissan's GPS navigation system called CarWings was also included.

The Dignity/Proudia nameplates were discontinued for the second time in November 2016.

See also 
 Mitsubishi Proudia, the shorter variation of the Dignity

References 

(Sources: Fact & Figures 2000, Fact & Figures 2005, Mitsubishi Motors website)

External links 

 Dignity data 

Dignity
Cars introduced in 1999
2000s cars
2010s cars
Full-size vehicles
Luxury vehicles
Limousines
Sedans
Front-wheel-drive vehicles
Rear-wheel-drive vehicles
Hybrid electric cars
Partial zero-emissions vehicles
Flagship vehicles
Cars of Japan